

The Taylor Coot is a two-seat homebuilt amphibious aircraft designed by Moulton Taylor, famous for his flying car designs. When a market for the Aerocar did not emerge, Taylor turned to more conventional designs. The Coot was nonetheless somewhat unusual for its low wing, a feature uncommon on most seaplanes and flying boats, which conventionally strive to keep their wings as far away from the water as possible. Instead, Taylor designed the Coot's wing roots to act as sponsons to stabilise the craft in the water. The arrangement allowed him to do away with the weight and drag penalties imposed by wingtip floats, and additionally gain ground effect benefits during takeoff. First flown in 1969, the Coot proved very popular with homebuilders, with an estimated 70 aircraft completed by 2007.

The wings and elevator surfaces of the Taylor Coot can be folded for transport and storage. Some builders have equipped their aircraft with auxiliary sponsons. It is equipped with tricycle landing gear:  The nose wheel casters freely and steering on the ground is accomplished with differential braking of the main gear.

The plans and three books about the Coot are available through Richard Steeves of Madison, Wisconsin.

On June 6, 2018, a Taylor Coot Model A registered as N100TN attempted to take off from a lake, but suffered hull loss. The pilot escaped through the canopy. However, the issue was determined to have been caused by the pilot choosing to take off with a known structural issue.

Variants
Coot Model A
Single-tailed version.
Coot Model B 
Two-tailed model

Specifications (Super Coot Model A, 180 hp Franklin engine)

See also

References

 John W. R. Taylor. Jane's All The World's Aircraft 1982–83. London:Jane's Yearbooks, 1982. .

External links 

 

Homebuilt aircraft
Amphibious aircraft
1960s United States civil utility aircraft
Single-engined pusher aircraft
Mid-wing aircraft
Coot
Aircraft first flown in 1969
Cruciform tail aircraft